Qezel Kand-e Sofla (also Romanized as Qezel Kand-e Soflá) is a village in Seylatan Rural District, in the Central District of Bijar County, Kurdistan Province, Iran. At the 2006 census, its population was 95, in 21 families. The village is populated by Azerbaijanis with a Kurdish minority.

References 

Towns and villages in Bijar County
Kurdish settlements in Kurdistan Province
Azerbaijani settlements in Kurdistan Province